Ormelle is a comune (municipality) in the Province of Treviso in the Italian region Veneto, located about  north of Venice and about  northeast of Treviso.

Ormelle borders the following municipalities: Breda di Piave, Cimadolmo, Fontanelle, Maserada sul Piave, Oderzo, Ponte di Piave, San Polo di Piave.

References

External links
 Official website

Cities and towns in Veneto